The points race was a track cycling event held 8 times for men and 4 times for women at the Summer Olympics. The event was first held for men at the second modern Olympics in 1900. It was not held again until 1984; it was then held every Summer Olympics from then until 2008, after which it was removed from the programme. A women's version was introduced in 1996 and also lasted until 2008.

The points race was replaced with the Omnium, which includes a points race as one of its multiple components, in 2012.

Medalists

Men

Multiple medalists

Medalists by country

Women

Medalists by country

References

Points race